Sarkand (Sarqan) is a town in Sarkand District in Almaty Region of south-eastern Kazakhstan. It is the capital of the district.

References

Populated places in Almaty Region